Rocellaria stimpsonii, common name the Stimpson chimney clam, is a species of saltwater clam, a marine bivalve mollusc in the family Gastrochaenidae. This species is known to occur in the Gulf of Mexico.

This small species bores into calcareous surfaces, including the shells of other bivalves. The clam forms a living space which is lined with calcium carbonate and is shaped like a bottle, hence the common name "chimney clam".

Description
The valves are white and translucent; they are also thin and delicate with a large gape at the front end, towards the dorsal surface of the animal.

References

Gastrochaenidae
Bivalves described in 1861